The Banaras Hindu University Kulgeet (BHU Kulgeet) , i.e.,   is a poem written  by Indian chemist and university professor Shanti Swaroop Bhatnagar. It has been composed by Pt. Omkar Nath Thakur.

The poem has been popularized and adopted in original as the official university anthem of Banaras Hindu University and is called Kulgeet. It is customary in the university for this anthem to be sung in chorus before any official event or festival of the university is started.

The last stanza of the poem is dedicated to Malviya ji, founder of the university. The university tagline in Hindi , is borrowed directly from the last line of the poem, while the English tagline capital of knowledge is a translation of the same.

Lyrics

Code of conduct 
The Kulgeet is sung in the university in chorus, and rarely alone. As a mark of respect, clapping after Kulgeet is prohibited.  The composition by Omkarnath Thakur is the official composition. There is no official length prescribed, but the official composition usually takes around four minutes and thirty seconds.

See also 

 Banaras Hindu University
 Shanti Swarup Bhatnagar

References

External links 

 BHU Kulgeet (on YouTube)

Hindi poetry
Indian poetry collections
Banaras Hindu University